Alan Davies Après-Ski is a British comedy television series broadcast on BBC Two between the 7 and 21 February 2014 to coincide with the beginning, middle and end of the 2014 Winter Olympics. Presented by Alan Davies, the three-part series was produced by So Television.

Production
Alan Davies Après-Ski was commissioned by Janice Hadlow and Mark Linsey for the BBC. The producer was Mark Barrett and executive producers were Graham Stuart for So Television and Alan Tyler for the BBC. Each episode was recorded in front of a studio audience on the day of the broadcast.

Episode list

References

External links
 
 
 

2010s British comedy television series
2014 British television series debuts
2014 British television series endings
2014 Winter Olympics
BBC television comedy
Television series by ITV Studios
English-language television shows